An Ayuntamiento is the body charged with the government and administration of the municipalities in Spain not bound to the regime of concejo abierto ("open council").

The Ayuntamiento, formed by the Mayor and the Councillors, is charged with the municipal government and administration.
An ayuntamiento is formed by a Mayor and the elected councillors, who compose the plenary. In municipalities with over 5000 inhabitants, a Government Commission ( or ) is mandatory, while the existence of the body in municipalities under that population is at the discretion of the Plenary or the regulations of the Ayuntamiento.

Since the 1978 Spanish Constitution, the Ayuntamiento follows a collegiate-representative model, with features of a corporative organism such as the double presidency of both the deliberative body (the Plenary) and the executive body by the Mayor, and the formation of the Government Commission exclusively by elected councillors.

Unlike in other European countries the Mayor is not directly elected. They are invested by the councillors. The indirect election, stated in the 1978 Local Elections Act was confirmed in the General Electoral System Act of 1985. The system of municipal organization is described in the 1985 Local Government Act. An 11/1999 Law superseding some features of the 1985 Act set increased powers for the Mayor, but the plenary also gained  more scrutiny over these powers. The Plenary lacks legislative autonomy.

The method by which the mayor is elected is as follows. If no head of list of each electoral list commands an absolute majority of the votes of the councillors in the Plenary, the head of list of the most voted list becomes Mayor.

The executive arm includes the Mayor, the deputy mayors and the executive committee formed by a number of the elected councillors ( or ). While the plenary retains the vote of censure to remove the Mayor, the system confers much power upon the Mayor, which has become a point of controversy.

The municipalities of Madrid and Barcelona have a special system, regulated by the 2006 Law of Capitality and Special Regime in the case of the Ayuntamiento of Madrid and by the Municipal Charter of Barcelona, approved in the 22/1998 Catalan law in the case of Barcelona.

Informational notes

References

Bibliography 
 
 
 
 
 
 
 
 
 


Local government in Spain
Forms of local government